Luumäki is a municipality of Finland. Its seat is in the Taavetti village. It is located in the province of Southern Finland and is part of the South Karelia region. The municipality has a population of 
which 
is water. The population density is
. The municipality is unilingually Finnish.

Neighbour municipalities are Hamina, Kouvola, Lappeenranta, Lemi, Miehikkälä and Savitaipale.

The president of Finland P. E. Svinhufvud died in Luumäki on February 29, 1944.

The name Luumäki means literally "Bone Hill". In the Finnish version of the comic strip Bone, the place-name Boneville is translated as Luumäki.

History
Luumäki was separated from Lappee as its own parish in 1642. The first church in the Luumäki parish was probably built as soon as the parish became independent. It was destroyed during the Great Wrath (Isoviha). The second church, completed in 1731, was damaged during the Lesser Wrath (Pikkuviha) and had become small and in poor condition by the turn of the 19th century. The church and the belfry built from 1781 burned down in 1839. The parish had acquired the drawings of the new church even before the fire of the second church, but its construction did not begin until after the fire of the second church due to a dispute over the location. The new church was consecrated in 1845.

Villages
Anjala, Antikkala, Askola, Ellola (Ellonen), Haimila, Heikkilä, Heimala, Hietamies, Himottula (Taina), Hirvikallio, Huomola, Huopainen, Husula, Huuhonkylä, Hyyrylä, Iihola, Inkilä, Junttola, Jurvala, Juurikkala (Juurikas), Kannuskoski, Keskinen, Kiurula, Kiviniemi, Kokkola, Kolppola, Kontula, Koskela, Kähölä, Lakkala (Lakka), Laukkala (Laukas), Lensula, Luotola, Marttila (Taavetti), Mentula, Metsola, Multiala, Munne (Munteenkylä), Niemi, Nokkala, Nuppola, Nurmiainen, Okkola, Orkola, Parola, Pitkäpää, Pukkila (Pukki), Pätärilä, Rantala, Saareks, Saarits, Saksala, Salmi, Sarkalahti, Sarvilahti, Siiropää, Sirkjärvi, Suoanttila, Suonpohja, Sydänmaanlakka, Taina, Tapavainola, Taukaniemi, Toikkala, Vainonen, Venäläinen, Viuhkola

Culture
The Luumäki Live Music Association (Luumäen elävän musiikin yhdistys or Luumu ry), founded in 1986, organizes light music concerts and rehearsal opportunities for musicians. The annual jazz music event Vallijamit is held in Luumäki in July. The first Vallijamit was held in 2002. The former State Agency Building was renovated into a new library during 2013. In the summer of 2018, the Luumäki municipal library joined the Heili Libraries.

Notable people
Pehr Evind Svinhufvud
Ilkka Remes
Arvi Tynys
Jarmo Mäkinen
Esa Kirkkopelto
Hannu Purho
Sulo Saarits
Jarno Kultanen
Harald Haarmann

References

External links

 Municipality of Luumäki – Official website 
  Taavetti fortress in Luumäki area
goSaimaa.com – travel information

Luumäki
Populated places established in 1642
1642 establishments in Sweden